Plamenac (also transliterated Plamenatz) is a Montenegrin surname, derived from the word plamen (flame), literally meaning "out of the flame". 

It has origins from the Boljevići of the Crmnica nahija in Montenegro. Its bearers are ethnic Serbs and Montenegrins, of Orthodox faith. The family descends from Ilija Bogustinović, a nobleman from Bosnia, who following its fall to the Ottomans fled to Zeta and became a prominent figure on the court of Lord Ivan Crnojević. He earned a nickname Plamenac (fiery), because at the meeting on Vranjina Island in 1492 he spoke so passionately campaigning for the war against the Turks that it seemed as the fire was coming out of his mouth, as observed by a Venetian envoy present at the meeting.  

It may refer to:

Arsenije Plamenac (fl. 1766 – 1784), Montenegrin Vladika (Bishop)
Ilija Plamenac (1821 – 1916), Montenegrin Vojvoda (Duke), Senator and politician
Jovan Plamenac redirect to 
Jovan S. Plamenac (1873–1944), Montenegrin politician and minister, Serdar (Count)
Dragan Plamenac (b. Dragan Siebenschein; 1895 – 1983), Jewish Croatian (later US) conductor, composer & musicologist
John Plamenatz (1912 – 1975) (Jovan P. Plamenac), member of government in exile and political scientist at Oxford
Markiša Plamenac, Montenegrin captain
Marko Plamenac, Montenegrin Serdar (Count)
Mitar Plamenac, Montenegrin diplomat
Mojaš Plamenac, Montenegrin Serdar (Count)
Petar Plamenac, Montenegrin politician and diplomat
Rade Turov Plamenac, Montenegrin Serdar (Count)
Rufim Boljević (fl. 1673 – 1685), member of Plamenac brotherhood and hence rarely referred to as Rufin Plamenac, Serbian Orthodox metropolitan of Cetinje
Turo Plamenac, Montenegrin Serdar (Count) and Senator

Montenegrin surnames
Serbian surnames